The Marcel Breuer House II, also known as the New Canaan Breuer House I, is a historic house at 122 Sunset Hill Road in New Canaan, Connecticut.  Built in 1947, it was designed by architect Marcel Breuer as a home for his family.  It is an important early example of his Modern Movement designs, with a cantilevered design featuring glass and stone finishes.  The house, occupied by his family for just four years, was listed on the National Register of Historic Places in 2010.

Description and history
The Marcel Breuer House II is located north of the town center of New Canaan, in a residential setting on the west side of Sunset Hill Road. The house is built using typical balloon framing techniques, augmented by the use of steel cables and specially designed exterior sheathing to assist in supporting the sections of the building that are cantilevered some  beyond the foundation's edge. The main east-facing facade is characterized by blocks of fixed and casement windows, separated by gray-painted cypress siding. An addition was made to the west (rear) of the main block was designed by Breuer protegé Herbert Beckhard.

The house was designed by Marcel Breuer and completed in 1947.  Breuer came to the United States in 1937, settling first in Massachusetts, where is first self-designed family home stands in Lincoln, near the landmark Gropius House.  He relocated to New York City in 1946, and chose New Canaan due to its proximity to the city and its leafy suburban character.  The house is an early example of Breuer's "long box" designs, in which the main volume of the house appears as a floating box, and also exemplifies the architect's interest in cantilevered designs.  In this house, the cantilevered section have been repeatedly shored up to deal with sagging.

The Breuers lived in this house until 1951, when they moved into Breuer's second New Canaan house.  Breuer also designed a summer house in Wellfleet, Massachusetts for the family's use.

See also
National Register of Historic Places listings in Fairfield County, Connecticut
Woods End Road Historic District, location of the Marcel Breuer House I

References

		
National Register of Historic Places in Fairfield County, Connecticut
Houses completed in 1947
Houses in New Canaan, Connecticut
Marcel Breuer buildings
Modernist architecture in Connecticut